Sunset on the Golden Age is the fourth album by Scottish heavy metal band Alestorm. It was released on 1 August 2014 by Napalm Records. It is the band's first album to feature new permanent band member, Elliot Vernon, on keyboards and the last one to feature guitarist Dani Evans before his departure in 2015.

Track listing

Personnel
Alestorm
 Christopher Bowes - lead vocals, keytar
 Dani Evans - guitars
 Gareth Murdock - bass
 Peter Alcorn - drums
 Elliot Vernon - keyboards, unclean vocals

Additional
 Hildegard Niebuhr - violin
 Tobias Hain - trumpet
 Jonas Dieckmann - trumpet
 Gordon Krei - programming
 Myk Barber (Prostitute Disfigurement) - guitar solo on "Walk the Plank"
 Lasse Lammert - guitar solo & vibraslap on "Mead from Hell"
 Luke Philp (Lagerstein) - lead vocals on "Hangover"
 Bren Casey - backing vocals

Production
 Lasse Lammert - producer, mixing, mastering
 Ingo Römling - artwork, layout

Charts

References

2014 albums
Alestorm albums
Napalm Records albums